London Overground Rail Operations Limited was a train operating company contracted to operate the London Overground train service on the National Rail network, under the franchise control of Transport for London. The company was a 50/50 joint venture between Arriva UK Trains and MTR Corporation.

History
On 20 February 2006, the Department for Transport announced that Transport for London would take over management of services then provided by Silverlink Metro.

In June 2006, Transport for London announced that Govia, MTR/Laing Rail, National Express and NedRail had been shortlisted to bid for the London Rail Concession. In September 2006, Transport for London announced that the extended East London Line would be included, and the operation branded London Overground.

In June 2007, Transport for London awarded the concession to MTR Laing, and operations started on 11 November 2007. The concession was for six years, four months until 31 March 2014 with a two-year extension option. The option was taken up with the concession to end on 12 November 2016.

In December 2007, Henderson Group, the parent company of John Laing plc, announced the sale of the Laing Rail division, which comprised half of LOROL, Chiltern Railways and a stake in the Wrexham & Shropshire open-access railway operator. In April 2008, Laing Rail was bought by the German Government's rail operator Deutsche Bahn, which now holds a 50% stake in LOROL. The price was said to be around €170 million. Laing Rail became part of DB Regio, before a restructuring saw it moved under the control of Arriva UK Trains.

In April 2015, Transport for London placed a notice in the Official Journal of the European Union, inviting expressions of interest in operating the next concession. On 31 May 2015, London Overground Rail Operations took over the Liverpool Street to Enfield Town, Cheshunt (via Seven Sisters) and Chingford services, as well as the Romford to Upminster service, from Abellio Greater Anglia.

In July 2015, Transport for London announced the shortlisted bidders for the next concession were Arriva UK Trains, ComfortDelGro, a Keolis/Go-Ahead joint venture and MTR Corporation. In March 2016, Arriva Rail London was awarded the concession commencing 13 November 2016.

Services
London Overground operates these services:
 East London line: Highbury & Islington to West Croydon/Crystal Palace; Dalston Junction to New Cross/Clapham Junction
 Gospel Oak to Barking line: Gospel Oak to Barking
 North London line: Richmond to Stratford
 Watford DC line: Watford Junction to Euston
 West London line: Clapham Junction to Willesden Junction
 South London line: Dalston Junction to Clapham Junction
 Lea Valley line: Liverpool Street to Cheshunt and Enfield Town via Seven Sisters, and Chingford via Clapton
 Romford–Upminster line: Romford to Upminster

Rolling stock
London Overground inherited a fleet of Class 150 Sprinter diesel multiple units, and Class 313 and Class 508 electric multiple units, from Silverlink. Between 2009 and 2011, the Sprinters were replaced with new Class 172 Turbostar units, and the Class 313s and 508s with new Class 378 Capitalstar units.

London Overground further inherited a number of Class 315 and Class 317 EMUs from Abellio Greater Anglia upon the takeover of the Lea Valley lines from Liverpool Street and the Romford–Upminster line on 31 May 2015.

Final fleet

Past fleet

Depots
London Overground's fleet was maintained at New Cross and Willesden depots.

References

External links
 LOROL official site

Arriva Group companies
Defunct train operating companies
John Laing Group
London Overground
MTR Corporation
Railway companies established in 2007
Railway companies disestablished in 2016
Railway operators in London
2007 establishments in England
2016 disestablishments in England